"Zoo Gang" is a song composed by Paul and Linda McCartney and performed by Paul McCartney and Wings.

Release
It was recorded on 25 April 1973 and was released on 28 June 1974 as the B-side of the "Band on the Run" single in the United Kingdom. "Zoo Gang" was the theme song to the short-lived television programme The Zoo Gang. In 1993, "Zoo Gang" was included as a bonus track on the re-issue of the album Venus and Mars on compact disc as part of The Paul McCartney Collection. It was the song's first appearance on an album.  It was later released on all editions of the 2010 re-release of Band on the Run.

References

Paul McCartney songs
Paul McCartney and Wings songs
Songs written by Paul McCartney
Television drama theme songs
Songs written by Linda McCartney
Song recordings produced by Paul McCartney
1973 songs
Music published by MPL Music Publishing